Alan Savage was the chairman of Scottish Premier League team Inverness Caledonian Thistle from 2006 until 2008. He resigned from his position due to being unable to commit sufficient time to the club. Savage provided the finance necessary to sign Romanian international Marius Niculae, and Savage's departure meant that Inverness could no longer afford the player.

He is also the chairman of Inverness based Orion Group, an engineering recruitment business.

In December 2013 it was announced that Mr Savage had donated £150,000 to the anti-Scottish independence group Better Together, stating that "My support for the Better Together campaign is stronger than ever following the publication of a White Paper that does nothing to convince me that independence would be a force for good for Scotland, Scottish people, the Scottish business community and the rest of our friends in the UK." This brings his total donations to £250,000.

On 7 March 2014 it was announced that multi-million pound plans to expand the Highland Hospice in Inverness had been given a massive boost by the businessman who lost his wife to cancer.

The chairman of Inverness’s Orion Group, announced his company was donating £1.25 million towards the £4.5 million Project Build Appeal, the largest single donation in the hospice’s 25-year history.

Mr Savage lost his wife Linda to cancer at just 53. After her death he raised money for Marie Curie Cancer Care, taking part in a six-day, 310-mile challenge cycle ride from Prague to Warsaw collecting £20,000 in sponsorship which his firm matched.

Notes

Year of birth missing (living people)
Living people
Chairmen and investors of football clubs in Scotland
Inverness Caledonian Thistle F.C.